is a Japanese manga series written and illustrated by Yumi Nakata. The manga was serialized in Futabasha's Comic High! magazine from January 22, 2007, to April 22, 2011 and the chapters collected into seven tankōbon volumes. An anime television series adaptation animated by Zexcs aired from January 4 to March 22, 2010.

Plot
The story revolves around Nayu Hayama, who embarrasses herself on the first day of middle school by accidentally showing her adult panties. As two other students, Yako Jingūji and Haruka Shiraishi, hear rumors of her engaging in "enjo kōsai", or compensated dating (which often is viewed as being close to or the same as prostitution), they investigate. They soon learn that Nayu is an "underwear monitor" who tests new underwear products, and has great insight on what underwear people should wear. Nayu hopes to help everyone get through the vital stage of their life by opening an underwear club.

Characters

The protagonist of the story, who also acts as an 'underwear monitor'. She takes keen interest in underwear research. As a result, she is pretty shameless when it comes to her underwear, or anyone else's for that matter. Determined to inform people about the necessities of underwear, she forms the Underwear Appreciation Society with the encouragement of Hiroki. Her motto is "A great day starts with a great pair of panties."

A petite girl with a generally fierce composure. Her family runs a kendo dojo, and thanks to her father's training, Yako is quite skilled in the way of the sword. She prefers to keep a tough image, and has a hard time admitting embarrassing things- such as liking cute or "girly" things.
 

A busty girl and Yako's best friend. She was ostracized back in grade school for developing at a young age. She often has trouble with males, as the boys at school tend to mock or objectify her because of her bust size. Helping to raise her three younger brothers, Nayu and Yako are often in awe of her motherly nature. She appears to have some romantic feelings for Nayu, leading some to suspect her of being a lesbian.
 

A serious boy who is embarrassed by the sight of underwear. He has a one-sided rivalry with Nayu on school grades as he always ends up being second to her. Over time, he seems to have a small crush on her (which he may be unaware of). Despite his conflicted feelings (for both Nayu and the Association), he remains loyal to the group. He gets angry with anyone (usually other boys) who think he joined the group for perverted reasons.

A girl from a rich family who seems to be rather knowledgeable about the seedier side of underwear, and looks down upon Nayu for her naivety. She considers herself as adult and even breaks the school rules just to look like one. She may harbor some resentment towards her mother, believing that she has to "surpass" her.
 

A young and very busty teacher at Nayu's school. She seems unaware of her appearance at first, wearing clothes that is either loose or too tight. She later becomes the adviser of the Underwear Appreciation Society. She is generally nervous, but admires Nayu for giving her courage about her femininity. She seems to have a crush on Keigo, who was her senpai in high school.
 

Nayu's step-brother who has been looking after her since their parents died. He works as an underwear designer and often gets Nayu to test out his latest products. Because of his line of work, some characters (especially Haruka and Yako) believe that he is a pervert when first meeting him. Though the girls quickly become much more at ease around him.

Media

Manga
Chū-Bra!! was written and illustrated by Yumi Nakata. It was serialized in Futabasha's Comic High! magazine from January 22, 2007, to April 22, 2011 and the chapters collected into 7 tankōbon volumes.

Anime
An anime television series adaptation animated by Zexcs aired on AT-X from January 4 to March 22, 2010. It uses two pieces of theme music; the opening theme is "Choose Bright!!" by Minori Chihara, Minako Kotobuki, Sayuri Yahagi and Yoko Hikasa, while the ending theme is "Shy Girls" by Chihara, Kotobuki, Yahagi and Hikasa. The last episode uses "We Know" by Chihara, Kotobuki, Yahagi, and Hikasa as an end theme.

References

External links
 Chu-Bra!! anime at TBS 
 

2007 manga
Futabasha manga
School life in anime and manga
Seinen manga
Zexcs